The maple bacon donut also spelled doughnut is a breakfast or dessert food that has become popular in some areas of the United States and Canada. It is distinct from other donuts because of the prominent bacon and maple syrup–flavored glaze used for toppings and  has been discussed in the media as part of the phenomenon sometimes referred to as bacon mania. The bacon donut has been described as tasting like a "camping breakfast" (Pancakes with maple syrup, breakfast sausage links, and strips of bacon) all in one convenient item.

Popular history

The Swirls bakery in Omaha, Nebraska started a "maple bacon donut craze" with its version sometimes referred to as "The Elvis". The bakery's owner, Dawn Brown, said she wanted something shocking that people would love or hate, and would talk about. She describes the concept as simple: "It's your breakfast plate turned into one item that you put in your mouth." She reported: response from her customers has been overwhelming, and she prepares five pounds of bacon daily. "I know that most people are coming for the maple bacon donut a.k.a. 'The Elvis'."

Dynamo Donut, in San Francisco, California, also serves maple bacon donuts.

At Voodoo Doughnut in Portland, Oregon, maple bacon donuts are sold under the name Bacon Maple Bar.

The Original Pantry Cafe in Los Angeles, described as the area's favorite greasy spoon that "has kept the faith for 85 years", offers maple-glazed bacon doughnuts for breakfast at its downtown location.

The Nickel Diner, in downtown Los Angeles, also serves up the treat and has the slogan "Home of the Maple Glaze Bacon Donut" on its website. Writing about reclusive author John Twelve Hawks, Carolyn Kellogg of the Los Angeles Times opined that the Nickel Diner maple-bacon doughnut "is so good, it should be able to get anyone to come out of hiding."

Nord's Bakery, on the edge of Germantown in Louisville, Kentucky, debuted a maple bacon Long John in 2009. "It looks just like any other maple cream Long John, but for the slab of bacon embedded in the icing," "The argument in favor is clear: a Maple-Bacon Long John is basically an order of pancakes, maple syrup and bacon that you can carry around in a bag and eat in the car with no utensils other than a napkin" and "it's something every bacon lover ought to try," the Courier-Journal reported.

In 2018 a popular donut place called Beiko la boîte à beignes opened in Québec, Québec, Canada where the maple bacon donut is a staple.

See also

Maple bar
Luther Burger
 List of foods made from maple 
 List of doughnut varieties
 List of breakfast foods

References

External links

Bacon dishes
2010s in food
American pork dishes
American desserts
American doughnuts
Canadian doughnuts